The Fokker C.VII-W was a reconnaissance seaplane built in the Netherlands in the late 1920s. Sharing elements of the highly successful C.V design, the C.VII-W was a conventional, single-bay biplane with wings of unequal span braced with N-struts. The undercarriage consisted of a standard twin-pontoon arrangement, and the fin and rudder continued through to the ventral side of the fuselage, creating a cruciform tail. The pilot and observer sat in tandem, open cockpits. The wing structure was wooden with fabric and plywood covering, and the fuselage was of steel tube construction with fabric covering.

The first twelve of the thirty examples produced were sent to the Dutch East Indies, with the rest remaining in the Netherlands. The type was withdrawn from front-line service in 1940, but some machines remained active in the East Indies as trainers until the Japanese invasion in 1942.

Operators

Royal Netherlands Navy

Specifications (C.VII-W)

References

Bibliography

 
 

1920s Dutch military reconnaissance aircraft
Floatplanes
C 07
Single-engined tractor aircraft
Biplanes
Aircraft first flown in 1928